The third Berlusconi government was the cabinet of the government of Italy from 23 April 2005 to 17 May 2006. It was the 58th cabinet of the Italian Republic, and the second cabinet of the XIV Legislature.

Formation
House of Freedoms did not do as well in the 2003 local elections as it did in the 2001 national elections. In common with many other European governing groups, in the 2004 elections of the European Parliament, gaining 43.37% support. Forza Italia's support was also reduced from 29.5% to 21.0% (in the 1999 European elections Forza Italia had 25.2%). As an outcome of these results the other coalition parties, whose electoral results were more satisfactory, asked Berlusconi and Forza Italia for greater influence in the government's political line.

In the 2005 regional elections (3-4 April 2005), the centre-left gubernatorial candidates won in 12 out of 14 regions where control of local governments and governorships was at stake. Berlusconi's coalition kept only two of the regional bodies (Lombardy and Veneto) up for re-election. Three parties, Union of Christian and Centre Democrats, National Alliance and New Italian Socialist Party, threatened to withdraw from the Berlusconi government. The Italian Premier, after some hesitation, then presented to the President of the Republic a request for the dissolution of his government on 20 April 2005. On 23 April he formed a new government with the same allies, reshuffling ministers and amending the government programme. A key point required by the Union of Christian and Centre Democrats (and to a lesser extent by National Alliance) for their continued support was that the strong focus on tax reduction central to the government's ambitions be changed.

New electoral law

During this second cabinet was also approved a new electoral law. A white paper for a proportional-only electoral system was presented to the Chamber of Deputies on September 13, 2005, only seven months before the 2006 general election. This reform, strongly backed by the Union of Christian and Centre Democrats, proposed a 4% election threshold before a party gained any seats, and a majority bonus of (at least) 340 seats for the winning coalition, the total votes for each coalition being the sum of the votes of those coalition parties which had won at least 4% of the national votes. The new proposal was approved by parliament.

An electoral survey published on September 15, 2005 by the national left newspaper La Repubblica claimed that, with the initial proposal of electoral reform become law, the House of Freedoms would win the next elections 340-290, even if they won only 45% of votes and the opposition coalition The Union won 50%, because the Union also includes several small parties with less than 4% of national votes. This could have been avoided if the small opposition parties ran on a common ticket. Aim of this bill of reform was to reduce the number of parties, and particularly the moderate Left would have taken advantage in respect to the smaller radical left parties.

The Union of Christian and Centre Democrats, commenting on the proposal, asked for the abolition of the 4% cut-off clause, whereas the National Alliance did not show any favour to this attempt of reform, with its leader Gianfranco Fini claiming to want first to vote for the constitutional reform, and then for the new voting system, on condition that the 4% cut-off were not repealed.

This proposal of law was strongly questioned by the opposition coalition, who defined it an "attempted coup". Opposition leader Romano Prodi said it was "totally unacceptable". Several newspapers politically oriented to the left nicknamed the electoral system proposal by the House of Freedoms as "", after "" (Italian for "fraud") and the "", (from Sergio Mattarella), the most common name for the previous Italian electoral law (there is a recent custom to nickname new electoral systems by a somewhat Latinised version of the name of the lawmaker; another one is the system used in regional elections, the so-called "" from Pinuccio Tatarella).

Notably, some smaller opposition parties, such as Communist Refoundation Party and UDEUR, support a proportional electoral law; nevertheless, they declared they were against an electoral reform by this parliament, because the current law would be changed too close to the 2006 general election.

The Italian prime minister Silvio Berlusconi had previously been a strong supporter of the plurality-based electoral law; in 1995, talking about his coalition, he even defined the plurality principle as "our religion".

A modified version of the first proposal, this time with a 2% threshold for entering Parliament and without vote of preference for candidates, but still without the support of the opposition, was presented to the Chamber of Deputies. The voting count started on October 11; the lower house of Italian parliament then approved the electoral reform on October 14.
The new electoral was then eventually approved on December 16, 2005, and countersigned by President Ciampi on December 23, 2005.

Roberto Calderoli, the main author of this electoral reform, defined this law "a rascality" (using the mildly vulgar term "").

Ironically, the new electoral law allowed Romano Prodi to count on a large majority in the Chamber and to obtain majority also in the Senate, where The House of Freedoms actually had more votes (49.88% vs. 49.18% of the Union).

Party breakdown

Beginning of term

Ministers

Ministers and other members
 Forza Italia (FI): Prime minister, 1 Deputy Prime minister, 10 ministers, 35 undersecretaries
 National Alliance (AN): 6 ministers (incl. 1 Deputy Prime minister), 16 undersecretaries
 Union of Christian and Centre Democrats (UDC): 3 ministers, 9 undersecretaries
 Northern League (LN): 3 ministers, 9 undersecretaries
 New Italian Socialist Party (NPSI): 1 minister, 2 undersecretaries
 Italian Republican Party (PRI): 1 minister, 1 undersecretary
 Independents: 1 minister, 1 undersecretary

End of term

Ministers

Ministers and other members
 Forza Italia (FI): Prime minister, 9 ministers, 3 deputy ministers, 32 undersecretaries
 National Alliance (AN): 5 ministers (incl. 1 Deputy Prime minister), 3 deputy ministers, 12 undersecretaries
 Union of Christian and Centre Democrats (UDC): 3 ministers, 1 deputy minister, 8 undersecretaries
 Northern League (LN): 3 ministers, 9 undersecretaries
 New Italian Socialist Party (NPSI): 1 minister, 1 deputy minister, 1 undersecretary
 Italian Republican Party (PRI): 1 minister, 1 deputy minister
 Independents: 1 undersecretary

Composition

Sources
 Italian Government - Berlusconi III Cabinet

References

Italian governments
Silvio Berlusconi
2005 establishments in Italy
2006 disestablishments in Italy
Cabinets established in 2005
Cabinets disestablished in 2006